Lazzaro is an Armenian record producer. Lazzaro has collaborated with many prominent Armenian, Russian and Greek musicians, such as Iveta Mukuchyan, Sirusho, Aram Mp3, Sofi Mkheyan, Nyusha, Sakis Rouvas and DerHova.

Early life
Lazzaro was born in Beirut, Lebanon, where he started kindergarten. After some time, his family moved to Yerevan. He has studied at Yerevan State Medical University. The musician has also lived in Stockholm. Currently, he lives in the United States.

Discography

Singles

As lead artist

As featured artist

Awards

References 

Businesspeople from Beirut
Living people
Armenian musicians
Armenian record producers
Date of birth missing (living people)
Year of birth missing (living people)